John West (16 October 1844 – 27 January 1890) was an English first-class cricketer, who played thirty eight games for Yorkshire County Cricket Club between 1868 and 1876, thirteen games for the Marylebone Cricket Club (MCC) between 1869 and 1883, plus one for the "Left Handed" against the "Right Handed". He was on the MCC groundstaff for twenty years.

Born in Sheffield, Yorkshire, England, West was a left arm fast round arm bowler and left-handed batsman. His best bowling, 7 for 42 for the MCC came against Hampshire, and he also recorded a spell of 5 wickets for 3 runs against Surrey.  In all, he took five wickets in an innings on five occasions, and 75 wickets in all at an average of 14.62.  A confirmed tail ender, he scored 605 runs at 8.52, with a best of 41 in the Roses Match against Lancashire.

After retiring from the game, he became a first-class umpire, standing in at least sixty five matches.  He umpired in a Test match on 5 July 1886, when England played at Old Trafford.

West died in January 1890 in Sheffield after battling illness.

References

External links
Cricinfo

1844 births
1890 deaths
Yorkshire cricketers
English cricketers
English Test cricket umpires
Cricketers from Sheffield
Marylebone Cricket Club cricketers